The Belgian Super Cup, Pro League Supercup, is a Belgian club competition played as a single match between the Belgian First Division A champions (also received the Super Cup host) and the Belgian Cup winners. If both teams are the same, the Belgian Cup runners-up participates as the second club. 

The most successful Super Cup club is Club Brugge with 17 titles, followed by Anderlecht (13), Standard Liège (4), Genk (2) and Lierse (2).  It was created in 1979 and held every year since, with the only exception 1989 and 2020.

The current holders are Club Brugge, who defeated Gent 1-0 in the 2022 match.

Results 

The winning team is shown in green background and italic for cup runners-up. The score of the penalty shoot-out is mentioned between brackets.

Performance by club
Below is the performance listed per club, sorted by number of wins.

References
 Pluto website - Belgian football history

External links
Belgium - List of Super Cup Finals, RSSSF.com

 
Recurring sporting events established in 1980
National association football supercups
Football competitions in Belgium